Me and My Gang is the fourth studio album by the American country music group Rascal Flatts, released on April 4, 2006 by Lyric Street Records. The album became the highest US debut of 2006, with 721,747 units and went double platinum in the first month of release. The album spent three weeks at number one on the Billboard 200 chart. It was the best selling album (not counting High School Musical) and the best selling country album of 2006. It has sold 4.918 million copies in the United States as of the chart dated March 24, 2012 and was certified 5× Platinum. This is the group's first album to be produced by Dann Huff.

The singles released from this album included "What Hurts the Most", which peaked at number one on both the Hot Country Songs and Hot Adult Contemporary Tracks charts. This was followed by the title track (which reached a peak of number 6), and then two number one hits with "My Wish" and "Stand". Later presses of the album also included a cover of Tom Cochrane's "Life Is a Highway" (a cover previously included in the soundtrack to the 2006 film Cars) as a bonus track. This cover, though not released to country radio, charted at number 18 on the country charts, overlapping with "My Wish". A video was made for "He Ain't the Leavin' Kind" even though it was never released as a single.

Track listing

Personnel 
As listed in liner notes.

Rascal Flatts
 Jay DeMarcus – bass guitar, backing vocals
 Gary LeVox – lead vocals
 Joe Don Rooney – lead guitars, backing vocals

Additional musicians
 Tim Akers – keyboards (1, 2, 6, 9, 12), accordion (12)
 Charlie Judge – keyboards (1, 2, 4, 6-13)
 Howard Duck – keyboards (3)
 Gordon Mote – acoustic piano (4, 5, 7, 8, 11, 12), keyboards (5)
 Tom Bukovac – rhythm guitars (1, 4-8, 10-13)
 Dann Huff – rhythm guitars (1, 2, 4-13)
 Jonathan Trebing – rhythm guitars (3)
 Jonathan Yudkin – fiddle (1, 2, 7, 10), mandolin (1, 5, 6, 9, 12), banjo (2, 5, 10)
 Darrell Scott – mandolin (9)
 Paul Franklin – steel guitar (2, 4, 5, 6, 9, 12)
 Travis Toy – steel guitar (3)
 Bruce Bouton – steel guitar (7, 11, 12)
 Russ Pahl – steel guitar (8, 13)
 John Jeannsome – fiddle (3)
 Chris McHugh – drums (1, 2, 4, 5, 6, 8, 9, 10, 12, 13)
 Jim Riley – drums (3)
 Lonnie Wilson – drums (7, 11)
 Eric Darken – percussion (1, 10, 12)

String section on "My Wish" and "Words I Couldn't Say"
 David Campbell – arrangements and conductor 
 Larry Corbett, Suzie Katayama and Daniel Smith – cello
 Charlie Bisharat, Roberto Cani, Mario DeLeon, Armen Garabedian, Peter Kent, Alyssa Park, Tereza Stanislav, Josefina Vergara and John Wittenberg – violin

"To Make Her Love Me"
 Charlie Judge – arrangements and conductor 
 Carole Rabinowitz – cello
 Gary Vanosdale and Kristin Wilkinson – viola 
 David Davidson, Conni Ellisor, Carl Gorodetzky and Pamela Sixfin  – violin

Production 
 Dann Huff – producer 
 Rascal Flatts – producers
 Jeff Balding – recording 
 Mark Hagen – recording
 Justin Niebank – recording, mixing 
 Todd Tidwell – recording, recording assistant 
 Drew Bollman – recording assistant, mix assistant 
 Greg Lawrence – recording assistant
 David Robinson – recording assistant
 Christopher Rowe – digital editing 
 Adam Ayan – mastering 
 Sherri Halford – art direction, design 
 Greg McCarn – art direction, design 
 Glenn Sweitzer – art direction, design 
 Chapman Baehler – photography

Charts

Weekly charts

Year-end charts

Singles

Certifications

References

2006 albums
Rascal Flatts albums
Lyric Street Records albums
Albums produced by Dann Huff